Samuel Louis Bodine (January 22, 1900 – September 15, 1958) was an American Republican Party politician who served in the New Jersey Senate and as chairman of the New Jersey Republican State Committee.

Biography
Bodine was born in Pittstown, New Jersey in 1900 to Amplius B.C. and Ellen Schenk (Hoagland) Bodine.  He was raised in Flemington, where his father had established the Bodine Lumber Company in 1895. He was educated in Flemington schools and then attended Lafayette College, where he was awarded a Bachelor of Science degree in 1920. After graduation, he joined his father's lumber company. He married Ida Rittenhouse Stryker on July 6, 1932, and they had one child, Samuel (known as Tony), born January 14, 1934.

Bodine served as Mayor of Flemington, New Jersey from 1928 to 1936 and went on to serve on the Hunterdon County Board of Chosen Freeholders from 1937 to 1942. In 1943 he was elected to the New Jersey Senate, where he served until 1953. In the Senate he was majority leader for one year and served another as Senate President and acting Governor.

In April 1953 Bodine was selected as chairman of the New Jersey Republican State Committee by Paul L. Troast, then the Republican nominee for Governor of New Jersey. He was credited with uniting party factions after Troast lost in a landslide to Robert B. Meyner, as well as bringing the party together to support the nomination of Clifford P. Case for United States Senate in 1954.

In 1957 Republican gubernatorial nominee Malcolm Forbes sought to remove him from the party chairmanship, but Forbes backed down from this move after Bodine was given strong support from county chairmen and he was reelected. He died of a heart ailment the following year at Point Pleasant Hospital at the age of 58.

References

External links
Biographical information for Samuel L. Bodine from The Political Graveyard

1900 births
1958 deaths
Chairmen of the New Jersey Republican State Committee
Lafayette College alumni
Mayors of places in New Jersey
County commissioners in New Jersey
Politicians from Hunterdon County, New Jersey
Republican Party New Jersey state senators
People from Flemington, New Jersey
Presidents of the New Jersey Senate
20th-century American politicians